Cormick may refer to:

 Coal Valley, Alabama, United States, also known as Cormick

People with the surname
 Craig Cormick (born 1961), Australian science communicator and author
 Johnny Cormick (1880–1957), Australian rules footballer
 Michael Cormick, Australian singer and actor
 William Cormick (1822–1877), physician of Irish origin in Qajar Iran

See also
 Cormack (disambiguation)
 Cornick (food), a Filipino corn nut snack
 McCormick (disambiguation)
 McCormack, a surname